Moonbase Alpha is a video game that provides a realistic simulation of life on a natural satellite, based on potential Moon base programs. It was made by the Army Game Studio, developers of America's Army, and Virtual Heroes, Inc. in conjunction with NASA Learning Technologies. The game was released on July 6, 2010, as a free download on Steam. At the Interservice/Industry Training, Simulation and Education Conference in 2010, the game won the top honors in the government category of the Serious Game Showcase & Challenge.

Moonbase Alpha remains available on Steam, and a modified version has been playable at an exhibit at the Museum of Science and Industry in Tampa, Florida since 2012.

Plot
Moonbase Alpha is set in the year 2032 and focuses on simulating a day in the life of a lunar-based astronaut. As a meteor impact damages an outpost near the Moon's South Pole, the player must take control of a member of the outpost's research team and repair the outpost in order to save the 12 years of research accomplished there. These tasks include repairing vital components of the life support system, solar array and oxygen units, and can be accomplished with a wide variety of tools ranging from robotic repair units to the lunar rover.

Development
Moonbase Alpha was designed as a precursor to Astronaut: Moon, Mars and Beyond, NASA's massively multiplayer online game that was never released. The game intended to encourage interest in space exploration in young children. Because the game is meant to be a collaborative effort, the repair mission can be conducted by six players with an additional six observers.  An online leaderboard is included, encouraging players to use teamwork to help repair the station faster and earn high rankings. 

The game was designed using the Unreal Engine 3.

Reception
Moonbase Alpha was released to mixed reception. Gameplanet gave the game a score of 6/10, feeling that it was too short and needed more diverse missions, but noted that it was still quite well-made for a free game. Common Sense Media said the game "shows students practical challenges of space", but that it was held back by poor introductory tutorials.

Moonbase Alpha also spawned a meme surrounding the DECtalk text-to-speech functionality within its internal chat system, where users would spam certain nonsensical phrases and words into its chat rooms, parsed by the TTS system in a humorous manner.

References

External links
NASA site
Moonbase Alpha on Steam

2010 video games
Windows games
Windows-only games
NASA online
Massively multiplayer online games
Simulation video games
Unreal Engine games
Video games developed in the United States
Video games set in 2032
Video games set on the Moon
Internet memes